The Lillian Goldman Law Library in Memory of Sol Goldman, commonly known as the Yale Law Library, is the law library of Yale Law School.  It is located in the Sterling Law Building and has almost 800,000 volumes of print materials and about 10,000 active serial titles, in which there are 200,000 volumes of foreign and international law materials.  The library was named after a US$20 million donation made by Lillian Goldman, widow of real estate magnate Sol Goldman.

It is also well known as the location where Hillary Rodham and Bill Clinton first met.

Facilities
The library is contained within five stories on the eastern wing of the Sterling Law Building, completed in 1931 and designed by James Gamble Rodgers. The library's main reading room, named for the Class of 1964, is located on the library's third story. Employing the Collegiate Gothic style used throughout the law school campus, it is modeled after the King's College Chapel at the University of Cambridge.

In addition to the library's main body, two annex levels of bookstacks are contained below Beinecke Plaza, and infrequently used items are contained in the Yale University Library Shelving Facility in Hamden, Connecticut.

Projects
Projects run by the library include the Avalon Project.

References

External links
Official website

Yale Law School
Yale University Library
Law libraries in the United States
Federal depository libraries